The Green March was a strategic mass demonstration in November 1975, coordinated by the Moroccan government, to force Spain to hand over the disputed, autonomous semi-metropolitan province of Spanish Sahara to Morocco. At that time, the Spanish government was preparing to abandon the territory as part of the decolonization of Africa, just as it had previously granted independence to Equatorial Guinea in 1968. The Sahrawi people aspired to form an independent state. The demonstration of some 350,000 Moroccans advanced several kilometres into the Western Sahara territory. Morocco later gained control over most of the former Spanish Sahara, which it continues to hold.

The Green March was condemned by the international community, notably in United Nations Security Council Resolution 380, as the march was considered an attempt to bypass the International Court of Justice's Advisory opinion on Western Sahara that had been issued three weeks prior.
 
Morocco gained control of most of the former Spanish Sahara, which it still holds to this day. The refusal of the Saharawi people to submit to the Moroccan monarchy gave rise to the Western Sahara conflict, still unresolved today, and whose main episode was the Western Sahara War.

Background

Morocco, to the north of Spanish Sahara, had long claimed that the territory was historically an integral part of Morocco. Mauritania to the south argued similarly that the territory was in fact Mauritanian. Since 1973, a Sahrawi guerrilla war led by the Polisario Front (armed and financed by Algiers) had challenged Spanish control, and in October 1975 Spain had quietly begun negotiations for a handover of power with leaders of the rebel movement, both in El Aaiún, and with foreign minister Pedro Cortina y Mauri meeting El Ouali in Algiers.

Morocco intended to vindicate its claims by demanding a verdict from the International Court of Justice (ICJ), which was issued on 16 October 1975. The ICJ stated that there were historical legal ties of allegiance between "some, but only some" Sahrawi tribes and the Sultan of Morocco, as well as ties including some rights relating to the land between Mauritania and other Sahrawi tribes. However, the ICJ stated also that there were no ties of territorial sovereignty between the territory and Morocco, or Mauritania, at the time of Spanish colonization; and that these contacts were not extensive enough to support either country's demand for annexation of the Spanish Sahara. Instead, the court argued, the indigenous population (the Sahrawis) were the owners of the land, and thus possessed the right of self-determination. This meant that regardless of which political solution was found to the question of sovereignty (integration with Spain, Morocco, Mauritania, partition, or independence), it had to be explicitly approved by the people of the territory. A UN visiting mission had concluded on 15 October, the day before the ICJ verdict was released, that Sahrawi support for independence was "overwhelming".

However, the reference to previous Moroccan-Sahrawi ties of allegiance was presented by Hassan II as a vindication of his position, with no public mention of the court's further ruling on self-determination. (Seven years later, he formally agreed to a referendum before the Organisation of African Unity). Within hours of the ICJ verdict's release, he announced the organizing of a "green march" to Spanish Sahara, to "reunite it with the Motherland".

In order to prepare head off any possible counter-invasion from Algeria, the Moroccan Army entered the far northeast corner of the region on 31 October, where it was met with stiff resistance from the Polisario, by then a two-year-old independence movement.

The Green March

The Green March was a well-publicized popular march of enormous proportions. On 6 November 1975 approximately 350,000 unarmed Moroccans converged on the city of Tarfaya in southern Morocco and waited for a signal from King Hassan II to cross into the region of Saguia El Hamra. They brandished Moroccan flags and Qur'an; banners calling for the "return of the Moroccan Sahara," photographs of the King and the Qur'an; the color green for the march's name was intended as a symbol of Islam. As the marchers reached the border, the Spanish Armed Forces were ordered not to fire to avoid bloodshed. The Spanish troops also cleared some previously mined zones.

The Moroccan arguments for sovereignty

According to Morocco, the exercise of sovereignty by the Moroccan state was characterized  by official pledges of allegiance to the sultan. The Moroccan government was of the opinion that this allegiance existed during several centuries before the Spanish occupation and that it was a legal and political tie. The sultan Hassan I, for example, had carried out two expeditions in 1886 in order to put an end to foreign incursions in this territory and to officially invest several caids and cadis. In its presentation to the ICJ, the Moroccan side also mentioned the levy of taxes as a further instance of the exercise of sovereignty. The exercise of this sovereignty had also appeared, according to the Moroccan government, at other levels, such as the appointment of local officials (governors and military officers), and the definition of the missions which were assigned to them.

The Moroccan government further pointed to several treaties between it and other states, such as with Spain in 1861, the United States of America in 1786, and 1836 and with the United Kingdom in 1856 

The International Court of Justice found that "neither the internal nor the international acts relied upon by Morocco indicate the existence at the relevant period of either the existence or the international recognition of legal ties of territorial sovereignty between Western Sahara and the Moroccan State. Even taking account of the specific structure of that State, they do not show that Morocco displayed any effective and exclusive State activity in Western Sahara. They do, however, provide indications that a legal tie of allegiance existed at the relevant period between the Sultan and some, but only some, of the nomadic peoples of the territory, through Tekna caids of the Noun region, and they show that the Sultan displayed, and was recognized by other States to possess, some authority or influence with respect to those tribes. "

The Madrid Accords

The Green March caught Spain in a moment of political crisis. The caudillo General Franco, who had led the country for 36 years, was dying. Despite the overwhelming military and logistic superiority of the Spanish armed forces based in Western Sahara in relation to the Moroccan armed forces, the Spanish government feared that the conflict with Morocco could lead to an open colonial war in Africa, which could put Francoist Spain into question and lead to an abrupt political change or a social instability and disaster. The Spanish government, directed by Prince Juan Carlos, who was acting Head of State in substitution of General Franco, and the incumbent Prime Minister Don Carlos Arias Navarro, was in no mood for troubles in the colony. Only the year before, the Portuguese government had been toppled by the Portuguese armed forces after becoming bogged down in colonial wars in Angola and Mozambique. Therefore, following the Green March, and with a view to avoid war and preserving as much as possible of its interest in the territory, Spain agreed to enter direct bilateral negotiations with Morocco, bringing in also Mauritania, who had made similar demands. Under pressure from Morocco, Spain also agreed that no representatives of the native population would be present in the negotiations that resulted in 14 November Madrid Accords. This was a treaty which divided Spanish Sahara between Mauritania and Morocco. In the agreements Spain agreed to cede the possession of the colony to Morocco and Mauritania, under the condition, expressed in point 3 of the Trilateral Agreement, that the views of the Saharan population had to be respected.

Spain received a 35% concession in the phosphate mines of Bou Craa and offshore fishing rights that were not respected by Morocco. Morocco and Mauritania then formally annexed the parts they had been allotted in the Accords. Morocco claimed the northern part, i.e. Saguia el-Hamra and approximately half of Río de Oro, while Mauritania proceeded to occupy the southern third of the country under the name Tiris al-Gharbiyya. Mauritania later abandoned all claims to its portion in August 1979 and ceded this area to Popular Army of Saharwi Liberation (Polisario), but it was instead promptly occupied by Morocco. Nevertheless, Mauritania preserved for itself a small outpost at La Güera to preserve the security of its major port of Nouadhibou.

The Polisario, now with heavy Algerian backing, refused the Madrid Accords, and demanded that the ICJ's opinion on Sahrawi self-determination be respected. The consequence was that a conflict raged between the Polisario and the Moroccan government. The conflict has still not been resolved. Currently, there is a cease-fire in effect, after a Moroccan-Polisario agreement was struck in 1991 to solve the dispute through the organization of a referendum on independence. A UN peace-keeping mission (MINURSO) has been charged with overseeing the cease-fire and organizing the referendum, which has still not taken place . Morocco has rejected the idea of the referendum as unworkable in 2000 and has suggested a plan of autonomy for Western Sahara within Morocco. That proposal has been rejected by the Polisario, and also by its Algerian backers; it was presented to the UN in April 2007.

Spain is divided between its desire to preserve a good relation with Morocco, its southern neighbor with whom it shares terrestrial borders in Ceuta and Melilla, and its responsibility to the international legality as the former colonial power. The traditional position of all the Spanish democratic governments until the election of Prime Minister Zapatero had been that the wishes of the Western Saharan population have to be respected, and of support to the organization of the referendum requested by the United Nations. According to the US Department of State's documents leaked by Wikileaks, Spain, under Zapatero, has changed its traditional position concerning the organisation of the referendum for the Western Sahara, and now supports the Moroccan position. The documents also stated that Spain had been trying to broker an agreement between the two parties. However, in her speech to the Spanish Parliament of 15 December 2010, the Spanish Minister of Foreign Affairs Trinidad Jiménez denied that Spain supports the Moroccan position in Spanish Sahara. She also argued that Spain will support any agreement between the Polisario and Morocco. In 2022, Prime Minister Pedro Sánchez announced that Spain would back Morocco's autonomy plan during a visit to Rabat.

See also
 History of Western Sahara
 List of Spanish colonial wars in Morocco

References

1975 in Morocco
1975 in Spanish Sahara
1975 protests
November 1975 events in Africa
Western Sahara conflict
Marching
Morocco–Spain relations
Settlement schemes in Africa
Politically motivated migrations
African resistance to colonialism